A  is a portable multi-paneled silk partition supported by a T-pole.

Construction

The curtain or veil hangs via ribbons or other decorative cording from the top crosspiece which is supported by the vertical bars which are supported by the pedestal at the base. The fabric is generally in two layers: a plain silk back lining, and a fabric with a design on it facing outward. Colorful ribbons of fabric are generally hung in the center of each vertical panel on top of the outer fabric.

The size of the  historically depended on where it was used.

This last type was generally used to veil the pillow where the noble woman slept, with the  being made of rosewood or red sandalwood.

Use
The  is often placed just on the inside of bamboo blinds, forming a portable double privacy barrier to the outside of the house. They are also used as portable room dividers inside the house. Today, they are most often used as decorations or to hide boxes or other unsightly messes in a home.

In former times, they would often be used to hide noble women from public eyes when they visited shrines or temples, and to provide additional privacy for the women at home. Smaller versions called  were carried by the female attendants of a noble woman in order to hide her from public view while she traveled.

See also
List of partitions of traditional Japanese architecture
 (textile doorhanging)
 (reed blind)
 (folding screen)
Pipe and drape
Purdah

References

External links
 
 彩る調度の品々 

Furnishings
Japanese traditions
Japanese bamboowork
Japanese words and phrases
Partitions in traditional Japanese architecture
Portable furniture